Gnorismoneura monofascia is a moth of the family Tortricidae. It is found in Vietnam.

The wingspan is 14 mm. The ground colour of the forewings is cream with indistinct brownish admixture and sparse brown strigulation (fine streaks). The markings are brown. The hindwings are cream.

Etymology
The specific epithet refers to the colouration of the forewing and is derived from Latin mono (meaning single) and fascia (meaning a fascia, element of marking).

References

Moths described in 2008
Archipini
Moths of Asia
Taxa named by Józef Razowski